Robert Paris (by 1487 – 1550?), of New Romney, Kent, was an English politician.

He was a Member of Parliament (MP) for New Romney in 1523. He was jurat in that town from 1508 and bailiff to Yarmouth in 1522.

References

15th-century births
1546 deaths
Members of Parliament for New Romney
Bailiffs
Jurats
English MPs 1523